Matala is a town and a  municipality in the province of Huíla, Angola. The municipality had a population of 262,763 in 2014.

Matala is situated along the Kunene River at an elevation of approximately 1300 metres above sea level; the Matala Weir is positioned at this point along the river.

Transport 
It lies on the southern line of Angolan Railways.

See also 

 Railway stations in Angola

References 

Populated places in Huíla Province
Municipalities of Angola